Julian A. Scott (February 14, 1846 – July 4, 1901), was born in Johnson, Vermont, and served as a Union Army drummer during the American Civil War, where he received America's highest military decoration the Medal of Honor for his actions at the Battle of Lee's Mills. He was also an American painter and Civil War artist.

Family

Julian Scott was the fourth child, of eight, born to Charles Scott (born 1815), a clockmaker, and his wife Lucy Kellum (1821 - 26 April 1855). Julian's siblings were Cleora (born 1841), Lucian (1843 - 19 July 1894), Alice (1844 – 1846), Julia (born 1847), Charlie (born 1849), H. Percy (born 1851) and George (26 April 1855 - 27 December 1863). Lucy Scott died in childbirth and Charles Scott remarried, in 1860, to Susan Pollard.

During the American Civil War, Julian's elder brother, Lucian, served with the 4th Regiment of the U.S. Artillery, was wounded at the Battle of Ball's Bluff, was taken prisoner in December 1864, and almost died at Libby Prison of starvation. Julian's younger brother, Charlie, enlisted at age 13 and became a bugler. After the war, Charlie moved to Missouri, then to Boston, where he became a physician. His brother, Percy, became an attorney in Illinois.

Scott married and had one daughter but, later, he and his wife separated.

Biography
Scott received his early education at the Lamoille Academy, known today as Johnson State College where the main gallery is named in his memory. Scott continued his studies, graduating from the National Academy of Design in New York and subsequently studied under Emmanuel Leutze until 1868. During the Civil War, Scott enlisted in the 3rd Vermont Infantry on June 1, 1861, at the age of 15 as a fifer and, in February 1865, received the Medal of Honor for rescuing wounded soldiers while under enemy fire during the Battle at Lee's Mills, Virginia.

When the war was over, he traveled to Paris and Stuttgart to continue his education. Scott's 1872 masterwork, the Battle of Cedar Creek, is located at the Vermont State House. The painting illustrates the contributions of his home state of Vermont in the American Civil War and is significant for its absence of glorification of war and instead shows the suffering and human sacrifice associated with war. Scott traveled west as part of a census party, painting Native Americans in New Mexico, Arizona, and Oklahoma. Many of his works from this expedition now hang in the University of Pennsylvania Museum of Art.

Scott was interred in Hillside Cemetery located in Scotch Plains, New Jersey.

Notable paintings
"Rear-Guard at White Oak Swamp" (1869–1870);
"Battle of Golding's Farm" (1871);
"Battle of Cedar Creek" (1871–1872);
"Surrender of a Confederate Soldier", Smithsonian American Art Museum Collection (1873);
"The Recall" (1872)
"On Board the Hartford" (1874);
"Old Records" (1875);
"Duel of Burr and Hamilton" (1876);
"Reserves awaiting Orders" (1877);
"In the Cornfield at Antietam" (1879);
"Charge at Petersburg" (1882);
"The War is Over" (1885);
"The Blue and the Gray" (1886);
"The Death Of General Sedgwick" (1887);
"Portrait of George B. McClellan" (1888).
"Encampment" (1884),  (https://commons.wikimedia.org/wiki/File:Encampment_VA.jpg)

Gallery

Medal of Honor citation

Rank and Organization:
Drummer, Company E, 3d Vermont Infantry. Place and date. At Lees Mills, Va., April 16, 1862. Entered service at. Johnson, Vt. Birth: Johnson, Vt. Date of issue: February 1865.

Citation:
Crossed the creek under a terrific fire of musketry several times to assist in bringing off the wounded.

See also

List of Medal of Honor recipients
List of American Civil War Medal of Honor recipients: Q–S

References

Further reading
 Titterton, Robert J. (1997). Julian Scott: artist of the Civil War and native America: with 97 illustrations. Jefferson, N.C. : McFarland & Co.

External sources

 
Native paths: American Indian art from the collection of Charles and Valerie Diker, an exhibition catalog from The Metropolitan Museum of Art (fully available online as PDF), which contains material on Julian Scott (cat. no. 1-3)

Union Army soldiers
American war artists
19th-century war artists
Vermont culture
United States Army Medal of Honor recipients
1846 births
1901 deaths
People of Vermont in the American Civil War
Vermont Brigade
Johnson State College alumni
People from Lamoille County, Vermont
American Civil War recipients of the Medal of Honor
Painters from Vermont
Burials at Hillside Cemetery (Scotch Plains, New Jersey)
19th-century American painters
19th-century American male artists
American male painters